Count René Boël (1899-1990) was a Belgian industrialist and Director of the Usine Gustave Boël. He was married to Yvonne Solvay (1896-1930), granddaughter of Ernest Solvay. They have two sons Yves Boël and Pol Boël and one daughter Antoinette Boël (1925-1982).

Career
After his marriage, he became director at UCB and at Solvay. During his career he advised the Belgian government in exile during World War II, and founded the Museum of Modern Art in Brussels. He was the first President of the Belgian-American Association, and chaired, between 1950 and 1981, the European League for Economic Cooperation, and was heavily involved in the European Movement.

Sources
 The Diffusion of US Management Models and the Role of the University: the Case of Belgium (1945-1970) - Kenneth Bertrams, July 2001
 Kenneth Bertrams, Converting Academic Expertize into Industrial Innovation: University-based Research at Solvay and Gevaert, 1900–1970, Enterprise and Society

References

External links
 European League for Economic Cooperation

1899 births
1990 deaths
20th-century Belgian businesspeople
Walloon people
Eurofederalism
History of the European Union